Xenoblade Chronicles 3 is a 2022 action role-playing game developed by Monolith Soft and published by Nintendo for the Nintendo Switch. It is the fourth installment of the open-world Xenoblade Chronicles franchise, and the eighth main entry in the Xeno series. Xenoblade Chronicles 3 depicts the futures of the worlds featured in Xenoblade Chronicles (2010) and Xenoblade Chronicles 2 (2017), and concludes the trilogy's overall narrative. The development team wanted to develop a story-driven game in the style of the first two entries in the series, while featuring content and combat gameplay from previous Xeno entries. The game was announced February 9th, 2022, and released July 29th the same year. Like the first two entries, the game was localized by Nintendo of Europe. 

In gameplay, the game is similar in story writing, but very different to previous entries in mechanics. The game takes place in Aionios, where two warring nations, Keves and Agnus, engage in perpetual war with soldiers with ten-year lifespans. The story follows Noah and his two childhood friends, Eunie and Lanz, from Keves, and Mio and her two fellow servicemen, Sena and Taion, from Agnus, who all gain a mysterious power and decide to cooperate to find safety. Through this journey, they uncover the mystery behind this perpetual war and the nature of their world.  

Xenoblade Chronicles 3 was received positively by critics, who praised its story, themes, gameplay, music, characters, and scale, while criticism was focused on its technical and graphical issues at launch. By December 2022, it had sold 1.81 million copies.

Gameplay 
Xenoblade Chronicles 3 is an action role-playing game with a large open world to explore. Unlike previous Xenoblade series entries, the game allows for seven party members to participate in battles at once, including the main party and an additional "Hero" character. Up to 19 Heroes can be recruited to the party by completing story events or sidequests, each possessing different skills and abilities. Party members will also gain the ability to change their character class, granting them access to different abilities. Under certain conditions, specific pairs of party members—Noah and Mio; Lanz and Sena; and Eunie and Taion—can utilize the Interlink system to combine into an Ouroboros, a larger form with more powerful moves. Like the previous entries, the game employs an open world design, with a day-and-night time cycle that affects in-game events, such as the availability of quests and items. Similar to Xenoblade Chronicles, the game takes place on a continuous open world, featuring a fast travel option for players to travel more quickly through the largest open world map featured in the series to date. When traversing the map, players can now turn on a quest navigation mode that will mark a line on the ground to follow if they are unsure of how to reach their destination.

Xenoblade Chronicles 3 has an action-based battle system, where the player manually moves the current lead character in real-time, and party members "auto attack" when enemies enter their attack radius. Unlike past entries, players have the ability to swap between characters in the middle of combat. Party members use abilities called "Arts". Some Arts may deal bonus damage or inflict a status ailment, depending on a character's position in relation to the enemy. Each character has a starting moveset based on a Class. Classes consist of different styles of fighting, which feature different abilities. There are 24 total classes currently available in the game. As a character continuously uses Arts in battle they will fill up a special gauge called the Talent Gauge. Talent Arts are special moves unique to a character that can be performed once the Talent gauge is full. Talent Arts are all unique—some will grant bonus damage against a dazed enemy, and others will regenerate health for any allies within an area. In addition to Arts, the "Break, Topple, Daze" combo will temporarily stun enemies in combat.

Every tutorial the player receives is archived under the Tips section in the options menu. The Training Drills feature allows people to redo any combat tutorial to ensure they understand a specific mechanic. This tutorial system is greatly improved from all previous installments in the series, guiding the player in the correct direction from the beginning of the game.

Similar to Xenoblade Chronicles, this game features the "Chain Attack" mechanic. A gauge slowly fills as party members hit their opponents, and filling it allows the player to chain multiple attacks together, for extra damage. This allows a player to select a special move on a menu with 3 options, with moves based on a character's current Class. After a player has selected one of the options, the Chain Attack turn begins. The goal of each turn is to get over 99 TP (Tactical Points).  TP is rewarded on each move during the turn. The player is able to select a move from each character, where the game rewards the player by adding TP to the gauge for the current turn in the attack. TP is rewarded based on the current Class the character has equipped, the amount of times the character has been used during the chain attack, and various other conditions. By achieving over 99 TP during the turn, the attack ends for that turn. There are 3 different ratings you can get after crossing 99 TP. These include "Amazing" (getting over 200 TP), "Bravo" (getting over 150 TP), and "Cool" (getting over 99 TP). The attack goes on for as long as the party gauge is not empty.

Plot

Setting and characters 

Set after the events of Xenoblade Chronicles (2010) and Xenoblade Chronicles 2 (2017), Xenoblade Chronicles 3 takes place in the world of Aionios, where the mechanically proficient nation of Keves and the ether-oriented nation of Agnus are at constant war with one another. The world is divided into colonies, each with their own giant metal mech called a Ferronis, which trap the life force of fallen enemy soldiers in a Flame Clock. The wars are fought by engineered soldiers with artificially limited lifespans of ten years, as they fight to fill their colony's Flame Clock in hopes of receiving a Homecoming ceremony at the end of their term. Among both forces are "off-seers", soldiers who play special flutes in rituals to send off the dead, functioning as a short funeral. The game features six main characters, including two protagonists: Noah, a Kevesi off-seer accompanied by his childhood friends Lanz and Eunie; and Mio, an Agnian off-seer accompanied by fellow servicemen Taion and Sena.

Story 
After a victorious battle against an Agnian colony, Kevesi soldiers Noah, Lanz, and Eunie, and their Nopon support, Riku, are given a special mission to intercept a mysterious airship. However, when they reach the area, they encounter an Agnian squad consisting of Mio, Sena, and Taion, and their Nopon support, Manana. As they battle, the airship's sole survivor, Guernica Vandham, intervenes and stops the fighting, claiming he knows their "true enemy." However, he is shot by Consul D, who is a powerful being known as a Moebius and part of an organization of the same name that controls the war between Keves and Agnus. D attacks Noah and Mio's teams, forcing Guernica to activate the Ouroboros Stone he was smuggling and imbuing Noah and Mio's teams with its power. D is forced to retreat, and a mortally wounded Guernica instructs the six to head for the "City" at Swordmarch, where they can find answers.

Realizing that the Consuls have ordered both Keves and Agnus to hunt them down, Noah and Mio's teams are forced to band together into a single party and start making their way to Swordmarch, liberating colonies along the way by destroying their Flame Clocks with a sword called "Lucky Seven" given to Noah by Riku, hidden inside his normal weapon. The Queen of Keves attacks the party with the Annihilator, a weapon of mass destruction built into Keves Castle, and threatens to destroy the liberated colonies with it, forcing the party to detour to Keves Castle. At the castle, the group destroys the Annihilator and discovers that the soldiers of both Keves and Agnus are actually clones forced to fight each other. They are then confronted by Consul N, a man physically identical to Noah, and the Queen of Keves, Melia Antiqua, from Xenoblade Chronicles. The party defeats "Melia", who is revealed to be a robotic imposter.

After escaping the castle, the party encounters the Lost Numbers, who are led by Guernica's daughter Monica. Monica leads them to the City, which is populated by humans with regular lifespans who oppose the Moebius as well. Monica explains that the war between Keves and Agnus is orchestrated by Moebius so they can harvest the life energy from the bloodshed to continue living, and then replace the losses with clones to repeat the cycle. The real Queens of Keves and Agnus created the power of Ouroboros to oppose Moebius before going into hiding. Monica then tasks the party to go to the prison underneath Agnus Castle and rescue a soldier named Ghondor, who is revealed to be Monica's daughter and knows the location of the Queens. The group stages a prison break, but they are ambushed by N and his partner Consul M, a woman physically identical to Mio; the party is defeated and captured, and only Ghondor escapes. The party is taken to Agnus Castle to be executed, where Noah lives through N's memories and learns that N and M lived countless lives failing to stop Moebius, leading him to accept a Faustian bargain with Moebius' leader Z to revive M and spend eternity with her; Noah and Mio are reincarnations of N and M.

It is revealed that M used her psychic powers to switch bodies with Mio, saving her at the cost of her own life. The party drives off N and destroys the robotic imposter Queen of Agnus, then awakens the true Queen, Nia, from Xenoblade Chronicles 2. D ambushes them and wounds Nia, but the party kills him in battle. Nia awakens and explains that in the past, the worlds of Xenoblade Chronicles and Xenoblade Chronicles 2 were parallel universes after being split in two, but would inevitably merge back together, destroying all life on both planets in the process. In order to avoid this, Nia and Melia collaborated across the two universes to create Origin, which would act as an ark to store all the data and memories of both worlds and then rebuild them once the universes merged. However, Z captured Melia and hijacked Origin for his own ends, creating the current world where Moebius feeds off the endless warfare. With Nia's knowledge, the party storms Origin, defeating N and freeing Melia. They confront Z himself, who is a manifestation of Origin's digitized souls' fear of the future and desire to stay in the 'endless now'. N and M, who remained spiritually inside Noah and Mio, return in spirit form and sacrifice themselves to destroy Z for good.

With Origin reactivated, Noah and the party decide to proceed with the reconstruction process for both worlds. However, this would require the people of Keves and Agnus to be separated and returned to their respective worlds. The Kevesi and Agnian party members say their farewells and Mio and Noah share a kiss with each other before the worlds separate, but promise to find a way to reunite one day. Melia looks fondly upon Shulk's Monado REX while Nia reunites with Poppi and looks upon a picture of her with her friends. 

In a post-credits scene, right after both universes have been split and rebuilt, Noah, Lanz, Eunie, and Joran are reincarnated in their world. As they head for a fireworks show, Noah hears the sound of Mio's flute playing and decides to follow the music.

Downloadable content 
Xenoblade Chronicles 3 has an expansion pack, retailing for about $29.99 USD, the same price as Xenoblade 2'''s expansion pass. The expansion pack comes in 4 volumes. So far, 3 of the 4 volumes have been released. Volume 1 of the expansion pass released on July 9th, the game's launch day and includes various consumables, acessories, as well as alternate outfit colors. Volume 2 of the expansion pack released on October 13th, 2022. This volume includes a new challenge mode, as well as a hero quest to unlock a new hero, Ino. The most currently available volume, volume 3 was released on Febuary 15th, 2023. This volume includes new challenge mode battles, new character outfits, and a hero quest to get the hero Masha. The fourth and last volume will be released by December 31, 2023, and will include a new story scenario with characters from the other Xenoblade Chronicle games, most notably, Shulk and Rex, the protagonists of Xenoblade Chronicles 1 and 2 respectively.

 Development 
The first ideas for the plot of Xenoblade Chronicles 3 came during the development of the second entry of the three games, Xenoblade Chronicles 2. According to Tetsuya Takahashi, creator of the Xenoblade Chronicles series, the Mechonis sword featured on the cover of Xenoblade Chronicles and the Titan of Uraya featured on the cover of Xenoblade Chronicles 2 is what sparked the idea of Xenoblade Chronicles 3. Bringing the two worlds together, the broken sword of the Mechonis going through the wounded Titan of Uraya is the visual key of Xenoblade Chronicles 3, indicating war between the two worlds, thus the starting idea for this game. In May 2018, Takahashi pitched Xenoblade Chronicles 3 as a new game concept to Nintendo. The first production group of Monolith Soft, known for their work on the Xenoblade Chronicles series, started development on the game in August 2018 after Xenoblade Chronicles 2: Torna – The Golden Country went gold.

 Music 
As with previous numbered games in the series, the game's soundtrack was written by Yasunori Mitsuda, Manami Kiyota, ACE (Tomori Kudo and Hiroyo "CHiCO" Yamanaka), and Kenji Hiramatsu. They were joined by Mariam Abounnasr, who arranged tracks for Xenoblade Chronicles 2. In order to create a sound that had not been heard before, Monolith Soft had custom flutes created in different sizes and tuned to different scales resembling flutes from the game. The first track Mitsuda worked on for the game was "A Life Sent On", its main theme. Takahashi told Mitsuda in advance to interweave the two melodies of Noah and Mio into a single piece of music, and Mitsuda seemed to have thought that creating the flutes would enable him to express himself easier.
As with Xenoblade Chronicles 2, the Irish choral ensemble Anúna assisted in recording vocals for the game. Members Aisling and Lauren McGlynn provided vocals for tracks themed around Ouroboros and Moebius respectively, while Sara Weeda sung 'A Step Away' and the ending theme, 'Where We Belong'.

 Release Xenoblade Chronicles 3 was announced in February 2022, and was initially set for release in September. It was later shifted to an earlier release date of July 29. The game is described as featuring a narrative that will depict the respective futures for the worlds of the previous two entries. Following the announcement, a blog post on the official Nintendo website revealed preliminary details about the game's development. Takahashi was confirmed to be working on the game in an executive director position, while various other returning staff members from previous Xenoblade Chronicles games were revealed to be reprising their duties, including the composing team behind the first two entries and Xenoblade Chronicles 2 lead character designer Masatsugu Saito, returning to work on the game's art alongside Xenosaga and Xenoblade Chronicles artist Koichi Mugitani.

 Special edition 
A collector's edition was announced on April 19, 2022 to be sold exclusively on My Nintendo Store, following the announcement of the July 29th release date. The collector's edition contains an art book, a steelbook case, and an outer collectible packaging. Preorders opened on June 7, but due to unforeseen logistical circumstances, the My Nintendo Store crashed on that day, logging various users out, leaving many unable to preorder the game. Furthermore, as a result of the release date being moved up in the year, production for the collector's edition ended up being hindered, causing certain Nintendo stores to sell the contents of the collector's edition, minus the game, as a separate item in the UK, while the extra contents of the North American special edition were delayed to ship in Fall 2022.

 Reception Xenoblade Chronicles 3 received "generally favorable reviews" according to review aggregator Metacritic.Nintendo Life enjoyed the changes to the combat system, specifically praising the new ability to combine character abilities, "Interlinking is a slick addition to the action here, it adds real drama and excitement to battles and is, most importantly, easy to get your head around." Destructoid liked the visuals, saying they were impressive despite the Switch's constraints, "Xenoblade Chronicles 3 is impressive looking by any standard. I took a ton of screenshots of this gorgeous world for fun." While feeling the ending didn't adequately resolve the story, Nintendo World Report wrote the game had the best balanced combat in the series, "It is challenging yet excellently paced. I rarely found myself over or underleveled." IGN criticized the pacing of the game, saying the included filler was unnecessary with the 150-hour runtime, "one section that has you go undercover to perform menial tasks, or another that has you trotting across the world to collect pieces of metal, and I often felt like my time wasn't being respected." GameSpot praised the new Master Arts for continuously evolving the combat system, "I am well over 120 hours in now and I am still unlocking new Master Arts, leveling up different classes, and uncovering powerful new tactics." Game Informer felt the world didn't have enough to do, and all of the biomes seemed to blend into each other at a certain point, "Beyond challenging monsters, collecting respawnable drops, and recruiting heroes at Keves or Agnus settlements, there's not much to do or see."PCMag wrote that the Switch seemed unable to keep up with the game's large vistas and combat, "here are noticeable resolution drops and object pop-in abounds. The frame rate isn't particularly steady, either, and the game can chug at times." Eurogamer praised the game for capturing the sense of freedom found in older JRPGs, "the sensation of running through endless fields of long grass with your companions, facing impossible odds with a spring in your step." Polygon liked the new optional content, feeling it was some of the series' best, "There are well over 100 side quests, and though their objectives could be rote, each told me something about how one lives in this world. It made me care about Aionios as an amalgamation of the land and its peoples."

 Sales Xenoblade Chronicles 3 was the bestselling retail game during its first week of release in Japan, with 112,728 physical copies being sold. It was also the bestselling physical game during its first week of release in the UK, where it had the biggest launch for the entire Xeno franchise in terms of copies sold. As of December 2022, it has sold 1.81 million copies.

 Accolades Xenoblade Chronicles 3 received multiple end-of-year accolades, including "Game of the Year" nominations at the New York Game Awards, Golden Joystick Awards, and The Game Awards. At IGN's "Best of 2022" awards, Xenoblade Chronicles 3'' won the category of "Best RPG".

Notes

References

External links 
 

2022 video games
3
Action role-playing video games
Japanese role-playing video games
Monolith Soft games
Nintendo games
Nintendo Switch games
Nintendo Switch-only games
Open-world video games
Role-playing video games
Single-player video games
Video game sequels
Video games developed in Japan
Video games scored by Yasunori Mitsuda
Video games featuring female protagonists
Video games that use Amiibo figurines
Works about child soldiers